Chionodes aruns is a moth in the family Gelechiidae. It is found in North America, where it has been recorded from Alabama, Kentucky, Louisiana, Maryland, Mississippi, Ohio, Texas and Mexico.

The larvae feed on Hibiscus species.

References

Chionodes
Moths described in 1999
Moths of North America